Chrysosplenium americanum, the American golden saxifrage, is a species of golden saxifrage native to eastern North America.

References

americanum